Yuanmou County (Chuxiong Yi script: ,) is under the administration of the Chuxiong Yi Autonomous Prefecture, in the north of Yunnan province, China, bordering Sichuan province to the north.

The famous Yuanmou Man was found in Yuanmou County in 1965.

Administrative divisions
Yuanmou County has 3 towns and 7 townships. 
3 towns
 Yuanma
 Huangguayuan
 Yangjie
7 townships

Climate

Tourist Resources
Besides the big discovery of Yuanmou Man, Yuanmou County is also famous for its Tulin, which literally means earth forest.It is a natural landscape composed of earth columns or pillars forming like immense forest. The unique landscape was formed by geological movement and soil erosion one or two million years ago. It is named for its shape like immense forest and the main composition of the expansion is earth.There are three scenic areas, which are Wumao Earth Forest, Langbapu Earth Forest and Banguo Earth Forest. Wumao and Langbapu have been developed as scenic areas. Yuanmou Earth Forest has been more and more popular these years.

References

External links
Yuanmou County Official Website

County-level divisions of Chuxiong Prefecture